Khanqah Daep Sharif or Khanqah-e-Usmania Sirajia Daep Sharif is a place for spiritual retreat and character refinement. It is situated in the Soon Valley of Khushab District in Punjab. This Khanqah was built for Muhammad Usman Damani by his disciples in 1887 CE.

History
Khwaja Muhammad Usman Damani was a prominent Muslim scholar and Sufi shaykh of Naqshbandi tariqah of 19th century (1828–1897) in South Asia (present day Pakistan). In 1885 CE (1303 AH) he moved to Soon Valley and made Daep Sharif his center of meditation and spiritual guidance. In 1887 CE nearby villagers Kufri and Koradhi donated 100 acres of land for the construction of the khanqah. A masjid, 20 rooms and a big compound was built.

The masjid in the khanqah expired in 1961 and was reconstructed the same year by Muhammad Ismail Siraji. The original inaugural stone is preserved in its original form.

Recreation
Daep Sharif is also a recreational place. In summer local people and tourists visit the nearby spring known as Daep Sharif Chashma.

References

External links
Soon Valley photos by Qadeer Ahmad Janjua

Mosques in Punjab, Pakistan
Sufism in Pakistan
Mosques completed in 1887